Leander Franklin Frisby (June 19, 1825April 19, 1889) was an American lawyer, Republican politician, and Wisconsin pioneer.  He was the 13th Attorney General of Wisconsin (1882–1887) and served in the Wisconsin State Assembly, representing Washington County.

Biography

Born in Mesopotamia Township, Trumbull County, Ohio, Frisby moved to Burlington, Wisconsin Territory, in 1846, where he taught school. In 1850, Frisby was admitted to the Wisconsin bar and moved to West Bend, Wisconsin. Frisby was the first district attorney of Washington County, Wisconsin. He was active in the Free Soil Party and then the Republican Party after 1854. In 1861, he served in the Wisconsin State Assembly. Frisby served as Wisconsin Attorney General from 1882 to 1887. Beginning in 1883, he practiced law with his nephew, Franklin L. Gilson.

His daughter Almah Jane Frisby was a physician and university professor. She was the first woman appointed to the University of Wisconsin Board of Regents, and to the Wisconsin Board of Control.

Notes

External links
 

People from Trumbull County, Ohio
People from Burlington, Wisconsin
People from West Bend, Wisconsin
Educators from Wisconsin
Wisconsin Free Soilers
19th-century American politicians
Wisconsin Attorneys General
District attorneys in Wisconsin
Speakers of the Wisconsin State Assembly
Republican Party members of the Wisconsin State Assembly
1825 births
1889 deaths
Educators from Ohio
19th-century American educators